Ken Yates is a Canadian folk singer-songwriter, who won the Canadian Folk Music Awards for English Songwriter of the Year and New/Emerging Artist of the Year at the 13th Canadian Folk Music Awards in 2017.

Originally from London, Ontario, Yates studied at the Berklee College of Music. He released The Backseat EP in 2011, and followed up with his full-length debut twenty-three in 2013. He won the Colleen Peterson Songwriting Award in 2014 for his song "The One That Got Away".

His second album, Huntsville, was released in 2016 and was produced by Jim Bryson.

Yates released the singles, "Two Wrongs", "Quiet Talkers", and "When We Came Home", in advance of his full-length album, Quiet Talkers, released in 2020. He released his next album, Cerulean, on June 3, 2022.

References

External links

Canadian folk singer-songwriters
Canadian male singer-songwriters
Musicians from London, Ontario
Living people
Berklee College of Music alumni
Canadian Folk Music Award winners
21st-century Canadian male singers
Year of birth missing (living people)